The Suyong Bay Tower is a proposed supertall skyscraper in Busan, South Korea. The tower was proposed in 1988 by Daewoo Corporation, but the proposal remained stagnant for years. Now, the latest proposal includes the tower into a massive redevelopment of the Suyong Bay and landfill.

References

Skyscrapers in Busan